Acacia amputata is a shrub of the genus Acacia and the subgenus Pulchellae that is endemic to an area of south western Australia.

Description
It blooms from July to September and produces yellow flowers. The rudimentary inflorescences have spherical flower-heads containing 10 to 20  light golden coloured flowers.

Distribution
It is native to an area in the Wheatbelt and Great Southern regions of Western Australia where it is commonly situated on undulating plains growing in sandy of gravelly loamy soils. The range extends from Narrogin and Brookton in the west to arouns the Frank Hann National Park in the north east and Boxwood Hill in the south east and it is usually a part of open shrubland or tall open Eucalyptus shrubland communities.

See also
List of Acacia species

References

amputata
Acacias of Western Australia
Plants described in 1999
Taxa named by Bruce Maslin